Sean Vanaman (born June 16, 1984) is an IrishAmerican video game designer, writer, and podcaster. He was the co-project leader and lead writer of The Walking Dead, and Puzzle Agent 2. He also wrote the third episode of Tales of Monkey Island, and was the designer of Wallace & Gromit's Grand Adventures, and the writer of the third episode, Muzzled. He was one of the regular hosts of the Idle Thumbs podcast and is one of the co-founders of Campo Santo, the company that produced Firewatch.

Early life
Vanaman was born and raised in Cork, Ireland. He and his family moved from Ireland to the United States.

Career
While studying at University of Southern California, Vanaman interned at Buena Vista Games (later renamed Disney Interactive Studios) in their creative development group. This group put together the initial concept and pitch for Epic Mickey in 2003. After graduation, he worked as an associate creative development producer at Disney Interactive. In 2008, Vanaman took a position at Telltale Games as a writer and game designer. He worked on Wallace & Gromit's Grand Adventures, Tales of Monkey Island, and Nelson Tethers: Puzzle Agent before becoming project lead on Poker Night at the Inventory and The Walking Dead.

On September 18, 2013, he and Jake Rodkin left Telltale and joined with Olly Moss and Mark of the Ninja lead designer Nels Anderson to found Campo Santo.

Recognition
Tales of Monkey Island, for which Vanaman co-wrote, was nominated for "Best Artistic Design" and won for the award for "Biggest Surprise" at IGN's Best of PC E3 2009 Awards. After release, it won the PC Gamer 2009 "Adventure Game of the Year", was nominated for the IGN "Best Adventure Game of the Year" for PC and Wii, won the Adventure Gamers "Best Adventure of 2009", and was named the "Best Series Revival" by OC Weekly.

Puzzle Agent 2 was nominated at IGN's Best of E3 2011 Awards for "Best iPhone/iPad Game". The Walking Dead also won over 90 "Game of the Year" awards since release.

Vanaman won Game (Original Adventure) and Writing in a Drama at the 2017  National Academy of Video Game Trade Reviewers Awards for his work on Firewatch.

Works

Controversies 
In September 2017, after known YouTuber PewDiePie said the racial slur "nigger" while live-streaming the game PlayerUnknown's Battlegrounds, Vanaman called him "worse than a closeted racist". He then said on Twitter that he would be issuing DMCA copyright takedowns on PewDiePie's videos that contained footage of Vanaman's game Firewatch, and urged other game developers to do the same. 
This led to backlash and review bombing of Firewatch on Steam.

In November 2020, a Reddit post accused Vanaman of abusing his administrative privileges as a Valve employee, by manually penalizing a fellow Dota 2 player for not following his recommended playstyle. Vanaman responded by apologizing on behalf of Valve and stating that employees from thereon out would be stripped of their in-game administrative tools – leaving actions explicitly to respondents of formal player reports.

References

External links
 
 Sean Vanaman on Twitter

1984 births
Living people
American video game designers
American video game directors
People from Cork (city)
Irish emigrants to the United States
Valve Corporation people